Rosemary Clooney Sings the Music of Jimmy Van Heusen is a 1986 album by Rosemary Clooney, of songs composed by Jimmy Van Heusen. Sammy Cahn, who provided lyrics for 5 of the 10 selections on the album, contributed liner notes for the album. Clooney performs two of the selections ("The Second Time Around" and "Call Me Irresponsible") as duets with guitarist Ed Bickert.

Track listing
 "Love Won't Let You Get Away" (Sammy Cahn) – 4:00
 "I Thought About You" (Johnny Mercer) – 5:11
 "My Heart Is a Hobo" (Johnny Burke) – 3:10
 "The Second Time Around" (Cahn) – 3:13
 "It Could Happen to You" (Burke) – 4:30
 "Imagination" (Burke) – 4:05
 "Like Someone in Love" (Burke) – 4:50
 "Call Me Irresponsible" (Cahn) – 3:30
 "Walking Happy" (Cahn) – 3:06 
 "The Last Dance" (Cahn) – 4:39

All music by Jimmy Van Heusen, lyricists indicated.

Personnel
 Rosemary Clooney – vocals
 Warren Vaché Jr. – cornet
 Scott Hamilton – tenor saxophone
 John Oddo – piano
 Ed Bickert – guitar (tracks 1,2,4,5,8)
 Emily Remler – guitar (tracks 3,7,9,10)
 Michael Moore – bass
 Joe Cocuzzo – drums

References 

1986 albums
Jimmy Van Heusen tribute albums
Rosemary Clooney albums
Concord Records albums